Ron Dugans (born April 27, 1977) is an assistant football coach on the Florida State Seminoles and a former wide receiver who played his 4-year National Football League (NFL) career with the Cincinnati Bengals.

Playing career
Dugans was a standout receiver at Florida State where he won a BCS Championship in 1999 season in his final season. Dugans caught five passes for 99 yards and two touchdowns in the  2000 BCS Championship Game. 

Dugans was drafted in the third round of the 2000 NFL Draft by the Bengals. He signed a deal with the Houston Texans but never played with the team.

Coaching career
Prior to joining the Georgia Southern Eagles' staff under head coach Chris Hatcher, Dugans spent the 2005 and 2006 seasons with Florida State as a graduate assistant, working with the wide receivers and the strength and conditioning program. In 2010, he was hired by Charlie Strong to become wide receivers coach at the University of Louisville.  In 2014, after four years at Louisville and Strong's departure to The University of Texas, Dugans returned home to Florida to become wide receivers coach for the University of South Florida. In 2016, Dugans joined Mark Richt's staff at the University of Miami and was co-offensive coordinator and wide receivers coach. In January 2019, Dugans was released by new Hurricanes coach Manny Diaz and hired as the wide receivers coach by Willie Taggart at his alma mater, Florida State.

Personal life
On September 5, 2008, a crash involving Dugans' daughter's school bus killed his daughter Ronshay, aged 8. There is now a national Don't Drive Drowsy Week (the first week of September) in memory of her death.

References

External links
Georgia Southern Eagles bio

American football wide receivers
Cincinnati Bengals players
Florida State University alumni
Florida State Seminoles football players
Living people
1977 births
Florida State Seminoles football coaches
Cincinnati Bengals coaches
Georgia Southern Eagles football coaches
Louisville Cardinals football coaches
South Florida Bulls football coaches
Miami Hurricanes football coaches